Super-Chief is the name of several fictional characters, including three superheroes and one supervillain, in the DC Comics universe. Created by Gardner Fox and Carmine Infantino, the first Super-Chief debuted in All-Star Western #117 (March 1961).

The second (villainous) Super-Chief debuted in The Adventures of Superman Annual #9 (1997) in a story by Mike W. Barr (writer) and Dale Eaglesham (artist). The third Super-Chief debuted in 52 Week 22 (October 2006), which was written by the writers' consortium of Geoff Johns, Greg Rucka, Grant Morrison and Mark Waid, and artist Eddy Barrows. The fourth debuted in Superman #709 (May 2011) and was created by writer Chris Roberson and artist Eddy Barrows.

Fictional character biography

Flying Stag
Flying Stag was a member of the Wolf Clan in the 15th century. He was by far their best warrior and knew he would be able to win the contest to become Royaneh, or Supreme Chief, of the Iroquois. Out of jealousy, Flying Stag's rivals trapped him in a pit where he prayed to the Great Spirit Manitou for help (the term "Manitou" is Algonquian). A meteorite fell from the sky and when Flying Stag wore it he gained incredible powers. He honored Manitou and called himself Saganowhana, or Super-Chief. He became a hero and married White Fawn. The powers of the mystical meteorite caused him to outlive everyone he knew.

Super-Chief experienced a couple of time jumps into the 20th century during the event known as Crisis on Infinite Earths. He allied himself with several Western heroes along with the superhero Firebrand and her former lover Cyclotron at one point during the Crisis.

Super Chief is one of the reanimated Black Lanterns in Weird Western Tales #71.

Villainous Super-Chief of Dry Gulch
In Adventures of Superman Annual #9 (1997), a young Native American is revealed to be in possession of the meteorite amulet and has agreed to use the powers of Super-Chief to clear out the town of Dry Gulch to make way for a gambling resort. He is defeated by Superman.

Jon Standing Bear
A new Super-Chief is introduced in 52 Week 22. A young Native American veteran and ex-con named Jon Standing Bear travels to Metropolis. He saves a young girl named Sierra from sexual assault by throwing a sleazeball through the window of their bus. No charges are pressed because the man already had a rape conviction.

Jon attends the funeral of his estranged father. Before his death of a liver disease, Jon's father had been caring for Jon's grandfather. Both had been upset with Jon, claiming he'd neglected his heritage and his obligations. Saying Jon is the last of the line, Jon's grandfather charges him with the duty of becoming Super-Chief. Per the old man's request, Jon suffocates his grandfather, releasing him from life, and takes the meteorite fragment.

Super-Chief joins an effort by Firestorm to found a new Justice League of America. In its first mission, the "JLA" attempt to settle a chronal disruption created by the now-villainous robot majordomo of Booster Gold, Skeets. Skeets kills Super-Chief, and Jon ends up in an otherworldly location. An elder named Flying Stag, apparently the original Super-Chief, indicates that Jon is no longer among the living and repossesses the amulet. Flying Stag admonishes Jon's ignorance of the price that must be paid for magic. Railing about his failures, Jon disappears into a vortex of clouds.

Super-Chief's corpse appears as a Black Lantern in the Blackest Night series.

After the 52 series was over, writer Grant Morrison stated: "If there had been space in the last issue I would have included a coda to the Super-Chief story. I had plans for Jon Standing Bear's return but we couldn't fit them in when issue #52 went from 52 pages to 40. I'm sure he'll turn up somewhere else".

Saganowahna of Wisconsin
 
At the beginning of Superman #709, a new young Super-Chief is seen thanking Superman for an assist on capturing runaway supervillains in the Colorado desert. Superman refers to him as "Saganowahna" and the young man claims that he gains his powers from a "manitou stone" he wears around his wrist; he claims that some believe the stone to be Kryptonian in origin, though Superman is skeptical of the idea. Evidently, the powers have a set time limit for daily use. The stone later proves to be a fragment of a Kryptonian sunstone that Superman scattered through time.

Saganowahna wears a uniform consisting of a red jacket with a yellow symbol on the back, a white shirt, black tights, and red boots. He is a Native American man who wears a mohawk. It is insinuated that Saganowahna is a Wisconsin native, because he invites Superman to visit Green Bay the next time the Metropolis Meteors play against the Green Bay Packers.

This new Super-Chief later accepts membership in Superman's new team, the Supermen of America.

Powers and abilities
 A radioactive meteorite fragment, worn in a necklace, grants Super-Chief super-strength, super-speed, and flight for one hour.
 Prolonged use of the meteor fragment apparently grants its users an extended lifespan.
 The newer Super-Chiefs may have slightly different powers than the original, since mention is made of super-senses but not flying. The third Super-Chief's powers are specified as "the strength of a thousand bears, the speed of a thousand running deer, the keen senses of the wolf nation, and the power in his legs to leap higher than the tallest trees in the forest".

References

External links
DCU Guide: Super Chief

Articles about multiple fictional characters
DC Comics characters with superhuman strength
Comics characters introduced in 2011
Comics characters introduced in 2006
Comics characters introduced in 1997
Comics characters introduced in 1961
DC Comics superheroes
DC Comics Western (genre) characters
DC Comics fantasy characters
DC Comics characters who use magic
Mythology in DC Comics
Fictional Native American people
Fictional Iroquois people
Characters created by Gardner Fox
Characters created by Carmine Infantino
Characters created by Grant Morrison
Characters created by Geoff Johns
Characters created by Greg Rucka
Characters created by Mark Waid
Characters created by Mike W. Barr
DC Comics male superheroes